Kōtarō Nogami (born 20 May 1967) is a Japanese politician who served as the Minister of Agriculture, Forestry and Fisheries from September 2020 to October 2021. He previously served as Deputy Chief Cabinet Secretary from 2016 to 2019, and is also a member of the House of Councilors of Japan, winning his first election in 2001.

Nogami served in the House of Councilors for Toyama from 2001 to 2007, serving one term. After losing re-election, he ran again in 2010 and successfully won the seat. In 2013, he was named State Minister of Land, Infrastructure, Transport and Tourism, and served in that position for a year. In 2016, Prime Minister Shinzo Abe appointed him as Deputy Chief Cabinet Secretary, and he served in that position until 2019.

References

Living people
1967 births
Place of birth missing (living people)
Liberal Democratic Party (Japan) politicians
21st-century Japanese politicians
Ministers of Agriculture, Forestry and Fisheries of Japan
Members of the House of Councillors (Japan)
Keio University alumni